The film The Marriage Market may refer to:

 The Marriage Market (1917 film)
 The Marriage Market (1923 film)

See also
 The Marriage Market (1911 operetta)
 Marriage market